Célestin Port (23 May 1828 – 4 March 1901) was a French archivist and historian.

Early life and education

Born in Paris to a modest family (his father ran an umbrella shop), he studied at the École des chartes, composed a thesis entitled  [Essay on the maritime commerce of Narbonne] (submitted in 1852) and, in 1854, became archivist of the Department of Maine-et-Loire.

Career
Spurred on by his teacher Jules Quicherat, he dedicated forty-seven years of his life to the history of Anjou, on which he published several important works. His masterpiece — often plagiarised — is his "" published in three volumes from 1874 to 1878. He also studied the War in the Vendée.

He worked at the same time on the classification of the departmental archives and, in 1891, he donated his personal collection of archival material to the departmental archives.

Other interests
Célestin Port made no mystery of his militant republican sympathies, but he kept his distance from party politics. His other interests included the theatre and Latin poetry. He also amassed a collection of engravings and photographs.

Publications 
  3 volumes, also published by Lachèse et Dolbeau, Angers.
  40 pp
  628pp.

Bibliography 
  (Reprinted from journal edition originally themed: "Républiques & républicains d'Anjou")

References

1828 births
Writers from Paris
École Nationale des Chartes alumni
Members of the Académie des Inscriptions et Belles-Lettres
French archivists
19th-century French historians
1901 deaths
French male non-fiction writers
19th-century French male writers